Gay Weddings is a 2002 American reality television series that aired on Bravo. The series, created by openly gay producers Kirk Marcolina and Douglas Ross, followed two lesbian and two gay couples as they prepared for their wedding ceremonies. Each episode combined interview footage of the individual couples and their families and friends with footage of the various couples going through their wedding planning activities along with video diaries from the couples themselves.

Couples
 Sonja, 39, emergency room supervisor and Lupe, 32, marketing representative. Sonja has a son, Brandon, from a previous relationship. He is supportive of their relationship but they are nervous about telling him about the ceremony.
 Harley, 28, sales and Scott, 32, consultant. Harley and Scott are marrying in Puerto Vallarta because that is where they first got together.
 Dale, 32, entertainment lawyer and Eve, 30, graduate film student. Dale feels that her family doesn't support her marrying a woman whereas they would were she marrying a man.
 Dan, 37, film studio global marketing executive and Gregg, 35, vice-president of an LGBT travel company. They fell in love while on a safari to Africa that Gregg organized.

Episodes

Reception
LGBT-interest magazine The Advocate described Gay Weddings as "deliciously gripping". MetroWeekly out of Washington, D.C. dissented, saying that the series "is not [a] stellar example of reality TV" and that it "has a cheap, thrown together on-the-fly feel".

Bravo aired the complete eight-part series on January 26, 2003 as counterprogramming to Super Bowl XXXVII. The ratings success of the marathon led Bravo to develop additional LGBT-interest programming, including the very successful Queer Eye and the gay dating show Boy Meets Boy.

With the success of the first season, the production company advertised for couples to appear in a second season of the program. However, no second season was produced. Bravo has no plans to revive the series.

Controversy
During the series' September 2 premiere, Bravo inadvertently ran a commercial for "family restaurant" chain Applebee's during Gay Weddings, despite Applebee's having asked not to have its advertising placed in the series. Right-wing advocacy group Focus on the Family criticized Applebee's as an advertiser. Bravo acknowledged that the ad was placed in error and no additional Applebee's ads ran during the series. The LGBT media advocacy organization Gay and Lesbian Alliance Against Defamation called Applebee's request not to have its ads run during Gay Weddings disappointing and suggested that Applebee's ran a risk of alienating a significant customer base.

Notes

References
 Engstrom, Erika. "The 'Reality' of Reality Television Wedding Programs". Based on Engstrom's "Hegemony in Reality-Based TV Programming: The World According to A Wedding Story (Media Report to Women (2003) 31(1) 10–14) and "Hegemony and Counterhegemony in Bravo's Gay Weddings (Popular Culture Review (2004) 15(2) 34–35). Collected as chapter 13 in Galician, Mary-Lou and Debra L. Merskin (2007). Critical Thinking about Sex, Love, and Romance in the Mass Media: Media Literacy Applications. Routledge. .  pp. 335–53.
 Jordan, Mark D. (2005). Blessing Same-sex Unions: The Perils of Queer Romance and the Confusions of Christian Marriage. Chicago, University of Chicago Press. .

External links
 Gay Weddings on Internet Movie Database

2000s American LGBT-related television series
Bravo (American TV network) original programming
2000s American reality television series
2002 American television series debuts
2002 American television series endings
English-language television shows
2000s LGBT-related reality television series
Same-sex marriage in television
Television series by Evolution Film & Tape